Autopsy: The Last Hours of... is a documentary-style television series that investigates the tragic, controversial and sudden deaths of celebrities. The series debuted in 2014 on Channel 5 in the United Kingdom and was later broadcast in the United States by Reelz. In 2016, the first American produced season of Autopsy aired with San Francisco's chief medical examiner (who was previously Panama City, Florida's District 14 medical examiner), Dr. Michael Hunter taking over as the host. The UK produced episodes featured Dr. Richard Shepherd and subsequently (after about the first ten episodes), Dr. Jason Payne-James (for about five more episodes) analyzing the official autopsy reports of various celebrities to determine their cause of death.

Celebrities featured

Dr. Michael Hunter, on April 8, 2022 through a Q&A Video for ReelzChannel has revealed that Season 13 of Autopsy: The Last Hours Of... is premiering on May 1, 2022. And the following celebrities are to be featured: Johnny Carson, André the Giant, Buddy Holly, Flip Wilson, Doris Day, Sean Connery, Robert Reed, Ricardo Montalbán, Chadwick Boseman, Sammy Davis Jr., Brandon Lee, John F. Kennedy Jr., James Garner, Eddie Van Halen, Jacqueline Kennedy Onassis, Owen Hart, Roddy Piper, Eddie Guerrero, Eazy E, Paul Walker, Telly Savalas, Freddie Prinze, and more to be revealed at a later date.

ReelzChannel has confirmed that the continuation of Season 13 has been postponed to early 2023 with a date still to be announced.

See also
Autopsy (HBO series)
Final 24

References

External links

 (ITV)
 (Reelz)

Channel 5 (British TV channel) original programming
Reelz original programming
2014 British television series debuts
2010s British documentary television series
2020s British documentary television series
2010s American documentary television series
2020s American documentary television series
Television series featuring reenactments
Television shows about death
English-language television shows
Forensic science in popular culture
American television series based on British television series